= Marqaati =

Anti-corruption organization based in Mogadishu, Somalia

Marqaati is an anti-corruption organization based in Mogadishu, Somalia. "Marqaati" means "witness" in the Somali language. Marqaati was involved in warning about Somalia's 2021 political turmoil. The organisation was also essential in combating corruption in Somalia's 2016 elections.
